Te Ata may refer to:

 Ngāti Te Ata, a Māori iwi (tribe)
 Te Atairangikaahu (1931–2006), Māori queen
 Te Ata (actress) (1895–1995), American Chickasaw Indian actress and story teller
 Te-Ata Reserve, a park in Atawhai, New Zealand
 Te Ata Kura, a book of poems by New Zealand writer Apirana Taylor

See also 
 Te Atatū (disambiguation), two adjacent suburbs in western Auckland, New Zealand